Janne Ofverstrom (born March 18, 1991) is a Finnish ice hockey player. He is currently playing with HC Keski-Uusimaa in the Finnish  Mestis.

Ofverstrom made his Liiga debut playing with HIFK during the 2013–14 Liiga season.

References

External links

1991 births
Living people
Finnish ice hockey forwards
HIFK (ice hockey) players
Ice hockey people from Helsinki